Bert Göbel (also Goebel) (born 14 July 1963 in Mönchengladbach) is a retired German swimmer who won a silver medal in the 4 × 100 m medley relay at the 1986 World Aquatics Championships. He also won national championships in the 100 m breaststroke events in 1986 and 1987.

References

1963 births
Living people
German male swimmers
German male breaststroke swimmers
World Aquatics Championships medalists in swimming
Sportspeople from Mönchengladbach
21st-century German people
20th-century German people